Written New Caledonian literature (as distinct from oral literature) is very recent. 

The New Caledonian Writers Association is an important advocacy group for literary activity in the islands.

The Oceanian International Book Fair (acronym SILO) has been a relevant meeting point since 2003.

References 

Literature
New Caledonia